Events from the year 1789 in art.

Events
 May 4 – The Boydell Shakespeare Gallery, designed for John Boydell by George Dance the Younger, is opened in London.
 James Stuart and Nicholas Revett publish "The Antiquities of Athens" with William Pars's 1765 painting "The Parthenon when it contained a mosque".
 Sir Joshua Reynolds loses the sight of his left eye, which forces him into retirement from painting.

Works

 John Singleton Copley – The Defeat of the Floating Batteries at Gibraltar, September 1782
 Jacques-Louis David – The Lictors Bring to Brutus the Bodies of His Sons
 Francisco Goya – Blind Man's Bluff (cartoon for tapestry)
 Thomas Lawrence
 Portrait of Queen Charlotte
 William Linley
 Joshua Reynolds
 Cupid and Psyche
 Puck (Boydell Shakespeare Gallery)
 John Trumbull – The Sortie Made by the Garrison of Gibraltar, 1789

Births
 March 7 – Michel Martin Drolling, French painter of history and portraits (died 1851)
 April 29 – Karl Ludwig Frommel, German landscape painter and engraver (died 1863)
 June 30 – Horace Vernet, French painter of battles, portraits, and Orientalist Arab subjects (died 1863)
 July 4 – Johann Friedrich Overbeck, German painter (died 1869)
 July 19 – John Martin, English painter and engraver (died 1854)
 July 31 – Jean-Pierre Montagny, French medallist and coiner (died 1862)
 September 7 – Friedrich Wilhelm Schadow, German Romantic painter (died 1862)
 November 12 – William Turner of Oxford, English topographical watercolourist (died 1862)
 November 20 – John Partridge, British artist and portrait painter (died 1872)
 date unknown
 Jakob Alt, German landscape painter (died 1872)
 Jules Robert Auguste, French painter Impressionist movement (died 1850)
 Giovanni Battista Cassevari, Italian miniature portrait painter, (died 1876)
 Auguste Hüssener, German engraver and miniature painter (died 1877)
 Elisabeth Charlotta Karsten, Swedish and Russian painter (died 1856)
 Hans Michelsen, Norwegian sculptor (died 1859)

Deaths
 January 4 – Johan Jacob Bruun, Danish gouache painter best known for his topographic prospects (born 1715)
 May 9 – Giuseppe Bonito, Neapolitan painter of the Rococo period (born 1707)
 May 15 – Jean-Baptiste Marie Pierre, French painter, drawer and administrator (born 1714)
 June 12 – Jean-Étienne Liotard, Swiss-French painter (born 1702)
 August 22 – Johann Heinrich Tischbein, member of the Tischbein family of German painters (born 1722)
 December 3 – Claude Joseph Vernet, French painter (born 1714)
 date unknown
 Kim Eung-hwan, Korean painter of the late Joseon period (born 1742)
 Jeremiah Meyer, English miniaturist (born 1735)
 Nikola Nešković, Serbian religious painter of icons, frescos, and portraits (born 1740)
 Thomas Parkinson, British portrait painter (born 1744)
 Orazio Solimena, Italian painter (born 1690)

 
Years of the 18th century in art
1780s in art